Dobele Parish is an administrative unit of Dobele Municipality, Latvia, encompassing Lejasstrazdi, Aizstrautnieki, Bērzbeķe and Bitenieki.

References 

Dobele Municipality
Parishes of Latvia